Summer Palace is a Qing dynasty palace in Beijing, China.

Summer Palace may also refer to:

Residences
Summer Palace (Rastrelli), royal residences in St Petersburg, Russia built for Empresses Anna and Elizabeth
Summer Palace of Peter the Great, royal residence in St. Petersburg for Peter the Great
Episcopal Summer Palace, Bratislava, a palace in Bratislava, which houses the government of Slovakia
Old Summer Palace, or Gardens of Perfect Brightness, a complex of palaces and gardens in present-day Haidian District, Beijing, China

Other
Summer Palace (2006 film), a 2006 Chinese-language film directed by Lou Ye
Summer Palace (album), a 2008 album by UK band Sunny Day Sets Fire